Paavo Lukkariniemi (born April 14, 1941 in Ylitornio) is a Finnish former ski jumper who competed in the mid-1960s. He won a bronze medal in the individual normal hill at the 1966 FIS Nordic World Ski Championships in Oslo.

Lukkariniemi's lone victory was in the normal hill event at Garmisch-Partenkirchen in 1966.

External links

1941 births
Living people
People from Ylitornio
Finnish male ski jumpers
FIS Nordic World Ski Championships medalists in ski jumping
Sportspeople from Lapland (Finland)
20th-century Finnish people